Vassili Danilovich Poyarkov (Василий Данилович Поярков in Russian,  – after 1668) was the first Russian explorer of the Amur region.

The Russian expansion into Siberia began with the conquest of the Khanate of Sibir in 1582.  By 1639 they reached the Pacific 65 miles southeast of the mouth of the Ulya River. East of the Yenisei River there was little land fit for agriculture, except Dauria, the land between the Stanovoy Mountains and the Amur River which was nominally controlled by China. Poyarkov was sent to explore this land.

In 1640 he was in Yakutsk as pismenyy golova (roughly, in charge of records and correspondence). In June 1643, Poyarkov with 133 men started out from Yakutsk. They were sent by the voevoda of Yakutsk, Peter Golovin. Having no idea of the proper route,  Poyarkov traveled up the rivers Lena, Aldan, Uchur, Gonam. Delayed by 64 portages, it was early winter before he reached the Stanovoy watershed. Leaving 49 men to overwinter, he pushed south over the mountains in December to reach the upper Zeya River in Daur country, where he found a land of farmers with domestic animals, proper houses and Chinese trade goods who paid tribute to the Manchus who were just starting their conquest of China. He built a winter fort near the mouth of the Umelkan river. To extract supplies from the natives, he employed excessive brutality, thereby provoking their hostility and making supplies harder to get. His men survived on a diet of pine bark, stolen food, stray forest animals and native captives whom they cannibalized.

By the spring of 1644 only forty of his men were left alive. Joined now by the overwintering party, they pushed down the Zeya to the Amur.  Their reputation having preceded them, they had to fight their way down the Amur through numerous ambushes.  By fall they reached the Gilyak country at the mouth of the Amur. With so many enemies behind him, Poyarkov thought it unwise to return by the same route. That winter they built boats and the next spring worked their way up the Sea of Okhotsk coast to the Ulia River and spent the next winter in the huts that had been built by Ivan Moskvitin six years earlier. The next spring, they followed Moskvitin's route along the Maya River back to Yakutsk, arriving almost exactly three years after they left.

Like so many Russian explorers and colonists in Siberia, Poyarkov received no reward. His brutal treatment of Siberian natives had made enemies even among his own men.  The voevoda of Yakutsk sent him to Moscow for trial and an unknown fate.  Whatever the authorities thought of Poyarkov himself, they were happy with the information he supplied. The next Russian expedition to the Amur was led by Yerofei Khabarov in 1650. See also Russian-Manchu border conflicts.

References

Sources 
 W. Bruce Lincoln, 'The Conquest of a Continent', 1994

Year of birth unknown
17th-century deaths
Russian explorers
Explorers of Siberia